Marcello Marchesi (4 April 1912 – 19 July 1978) was an Italian author, screenwriter and film director. He wrote more than 60 films between 1939 and 1977. He also directed six films between 1951 and 1952. He was born in Milan and died in San Giovanni di Sinis, Cabras, Italy.

Selected filmography

 Defendant, Stand Up! (1939)
 Non me lo dire! (1940)
 Schoolgirl Diary (1941)
 Invisible Chains (1942)
 The Lady Is Fickle (1942)
 Labbra serrate (1942)
 Stasera niente di nuovo (1942)
 The Za-Bum Circus (1944)
 The Whole City Sings (1945)
 Toto Tours Italy (1948)
 Fear and Sand (1948)
 Eleven Men and a Ball (1948)
 Be Seeing You, Father (1948)
 Little Lady (1949)
 The Firemen of Viggiù (1949)
 Adam and Eve (1949)
 Totò Tarzan (1950)
 The Steamship Owner (1951)
 The Dream of Zorro (1952)
 Figaro Here, Figaro There (1950)
 The Cadets of Gascony (1950)
 The Knight Has Arrived! (1950)
 Toto the Sheik (1950)
 Toto the Third Man (1951)
 The Reluctant Magician (1951)
 Beauties on Bicycles (1951)
 Seven Hours of Trouble (1951)
 I'm the Capataz (1951)
 Arrivano i nostri (1951)
 Free Escape (1951)
 Poppy (1952)
 If You Won a Hundred Million (1953)
 The Enchanting Enemy (1953)
 It Was She Who Wanted It! (1953)
 Laugh! Laugh! Laugh! (1954)
 Hercules in the Valley of Woe (1961)
 The Most Beautiful Couple in the World (1968)

References

External links

1912 births
1978 deaths
Deaths by drowning
Italian male screenwriters
Italian film directors
Accidental deaths in Italy
20th-century Italian screenwriters
20th-century Italian male writers